Pamela Payton-Wright (November 1, 1941 – December 14, 2019) was an American actress.

Life and work
Payton-Wright was born in Pittsburgh, Pennsylvania, the daughter of Eleanor Ruth (née McKinley) and Gordon Edgar Payton-Wright. After graduating from Tuscaloosa High School, she graduated from Birmingham–Southern College in 1963. She began her film career in 1972 as Rhonda on Corky. She later joined the cast of Another World in 1979 in the role of Hazel Parker, a role she played for one year.

Payton-Wright appeared in numerous Broadway and Off-Broadway productions. Following numerous film roles and television appearances, Payton-Wright joined the cast of the ABC soap opera, One Life to Live, in 1991, and was the first to play the role of sweet natured, but simple-minded Agatha "Addie" Cramer. She played this part recurringly on the show.

She died on December 14, 2019 in Harmony, Pennsylvania, aged 78, from undisclosed causes.

Filmography

Film

Television

Theater

Broadway

Off-Broadway

References

External links
 
 
 Pamela Payton-Wright at Internet Off-Broadway Database
 Pamela Payton-Wright interview: Performance Working in the Theatre CUNY-TV video by the American Theatre Wing, September 1989

1941 births
2019 deaths
Actresses from Pittsburgh
Actresses from Alabama
American soap opera actresses
American stage actresses
American television actresses
Obie Award recipients
20th-century American actresses
21st-century American actresses